Butoiești is a commune located in Mehedinți County, Oltenia, Romania. It is composed of eight villages: Argineşti, Butoiești, Buicești, Gura Motrului, Jugastru, Pluta, Răduțești and Țânțaru.

References

Communes in Mehedinți County
Localities in Oltenia